Dixie Lullaby may refer to:

 Dixie Lullaby (book), a  2004 book by Mark Kemp
 "Dixie Lullaby (song)", a song by Pat Green from the album Cannonball (2006)
 "Dixie Lullaby", a song by Leon Russell from the eponymous album (1970)

See also 

Dixie Lullabies, an album by The Kentucky Headliners
Lullaby (Dixie Chicks song)